The Taça Victorino Cunha (in English: Victorinho Cunha Cup) is an annual basketball tournament contested by Angolan basketball teams. The tournament was established in 2009, in honour of former Angolan basketball coach Victorino Cunha.

As of 2014, the tournament became an international event, with the participation of US SAG University Men's Basketball team.

Victorino Cunha Cup winners

Participation details (2009–2015)

Titles won

See also
 Victorino Cunha
 BIC Basket
 Supertaça Compal

References

Victorino Cunha Cup
Basketball cup competitions in Angola